Ten Brothers (十兄弟) is a 1985 ATV drama series produced in Hong Kong.  It is the first TV series to follow the Chinese mythology story of the same name.

Synopsis
The story is based on a couple who gave birth to the ten brothers.  The brothers later would discover they have supernatural abilities.

Cast

References

Asia Television original programming
1985 Hong Kong television series debuts
1980s Hong Kong television series
Cantonese-language television shows